Kristina Ohlsson (born March 2, 1979) is a Swedish political scientist and award-winning writer.

She grew up in Kristianstad and then moved to Gothenburg, where she studied Political sciences. Then, she obtained a master’s degree in political sciences and crisis management from Swedish Defence University in Stockholm. Ohlsson has worked as a Counter-Terrorism Officer at the Organization for Security and Co-operation in Europe; she has also worked for the Swedish Security Service, for the Swedish Ministry for Foreign Affairs and for the Swedish National Defense College. She lives in Stockholm.

Besides her adult fiction, which includes a series featuring investigative analyst Fredrika Bergman, Ohlsson has also written a popular trilogy of children's suspense novels. In 2010, she was awarded the Stabilo Prize for Best Crime Writer of Southern Sweden. In 2013, she received the Children's Novel Award from Sveriges Radio. In 2017, she was awarded the Crimetime Specsavers Award for children's crime fiction.

Ohlsson's first novel Unwanted was adapted for Swedish TV as Sthlm Rekviem (Stockholm Requiem on Walter Presents in the UK).

Selected works 
Fredrika Bergman series
Askungar, crime novel (2009), translated as Unwanted (2012)
  Tusenskönor , crime novel (2010), translated as Silenced (2012), shortlist for Swedish Crime Writers' Academy Best Crime Novel of the Year
 Änglavakter , crime novel (2011), translated as The Disappeared (2013), shortlist for Swedish Crime Writers' Academy Best Crime Novel
 Paradisoffer , crime novel (2012), translated as Hostage
 Davidsstjärnor , crime novel (2013), translated as The Chosen
Syndafloder, crime novel (2017), translated as The Flood

Martin Brenner series
 Lotus BLues , crime novel (2014)
 Mios BLues , crime novel (2015)

References 

1979 births
Living people
People from Kristianstad Municipality
Swedish women novelists
Swedish crime fiction writers
Writers from Scania